Glanów  is a village in the administrative district of Gmina Trzyciąż, within Olkusz County, Lesser Poland Voivodeship, in southern Poland.

The village has a population of 440.

References

Villages in Olkusz County